Gymnoscelis nepotalis is a moth in the family Geometridae. It was described by Louis Beethoven Prout in 1958. It is found on Java.

References

Moths described in 1958
nepotalis